Pimelea fugiens is a species of flowering plant in the family Thymelaeaceae and is endemic to central Queensland. It is a shrub with elliptic leaves and heads of 12 to 18 pale yellow, tube-shaped flowers.

Description
The upper surface of the leaves is more or less glabrous and the lower surface is sparsely hairy. Flowering has been observed in April, May and October.

Taxonomy
Pimelea fugiens  was first formally described in 2017 by Anthony Bean in the journal Austrobaileya from specimens he collected near Thangool in 2009. The specific epithet (fugiens) means "avoiding" or "averse to", and refers to the observation that cattle avoid eating the plant, and that it is likely to be toxic.

Distribution and habitat
This pimelea is only known from two sites near Biloela, where it grows in dry gullies dominated by Melaleuca bracteata.

Conservation status
Pimelea fugiens is listed as "critically endangered" under the Queensland Government Nature Conservation Act 1992.

References

fugiens
Flora of Queensland
Malvales of Australia
Plants described in 2017
Taxa named by Anthony Bean